Round Hill may refer to several places:

Antarctica
 Round Hill (Heard Island)

Australia 
 Round Hill, Queensland, a locality in the Gladstone Region
 Round Hill, Tasmania, a locality in Australia

Canada
 Round Hill, Alberta
 Rural Municipality of Round Hill No. 467, Saskatchewan
 Round Hill, Nova Scotia

Jamaica
 Round Hill Hotel and Villas, a resort in Hopewell, Jamaica

New Zealand
Round Hill, near Pahia, Southland
Roundhill Ski Area, Canterbury

Solomon Islands
 Round Hill, Arundel Island

United Kingdom
 Round Hill, London, a small approach to the main flank of the Norwood Ridge
 Round Hill, North Pennines, a Nuttall mountain in England
 Round Hill, North Yorkshire, a 454 m hill on the North York Moors
 Round Hill, Oxfordshire, part of Wittenham Clumps
 Round Hill, Brighton, an area of Brighton
 Roundhill, County Tyrone, a townland in County Tyrone, Northern Ireland

United States
 Round Hill, Connecticut
 Round Hill, Kentucky
 Round Hill, Massachusetts
 Round Hill (Greene County, New York), a mountain in the Catskills
 Round Hill (Mount Vernon, Ohio), on the National Register of Historic Places
 Round Hill, Frederick County, Virginia
 Round Hill, Loudoun County, Virginia (incorporated)
 Round Hill, Rappahannock County, Virginia